Gheorghe Remenco (November 19, 1918 - October 29, 1977) was a journalist and author from Chişinău, Bessarabia, son of Alexandra Remenco and Dumitru Remenco.

Works
 Lielie ciocârlie (despre cântăreaţa Tamara Ciobanu), Chişinău, 1964.
 Prin Chişinău odinioară şi azi, (Chişinău, 1966),
 La baştina frumosului (Chişinău, 1970),
 Comoara noastră - monumentele, (Chişinău, 1977)

Bibliography 
 Donos, Alexandru. În dar oamenilor: [Schiţă despre jurnalistul Gheorghe Remenco] // Nistru, 1979, Nr. 7, pp. 115–121.
 Iurie Colesnic, Destinul tragic al unui filozof din Basarabia interbelică: despre Dumitru Remenco (1895-1940), filozof, ziarist la "Cuvânt moldovenesc", "Glasul Basarabiei", Viaţa Basarabiei, 2004, Nr. 2. pp. 210–220.

References

External links 
 Dumitru I. Remenco - ziarist şi filosof
 Destinul tragic al unui filozof din Basarabia interbelică : [despre Dumitru Remenco (1895-1940), filozof, ziarist la "Cuvânt moldovenesc", "Glasul Basarabiei"
 CONTRIBUŢII PRIVIND ACTIVITATEA ORFELINATULUI „CASA COPILULUI” DIN CHIŞINĂU, Vera Stăvilă, Muzeul Naţional de Arheologie şi Istorie a Moldovei, str. 31 August, 121-A, MD-2012 Chişinău, Republica Moldova (2007) - Artikel (Moldavisch)
 Contribution to the study of the activity of the Chişinău orphanage “Children’s home”

1918 births
1977 deaths
Writers from Chișinău
Moldovan journalists
Male journalists
20th-century journalists